Wrzeście is a PKP railway station in Wrzeście (Pomeranian Voivodeship), Poland.

Lines crossing the station

References 
Wrzeście article  at  Polish Stations Database], URL accessed at 18 March 2006

Railway stations in Pomeranian Voivodeship
Lębork County